Todsapol Lated (born May 7, 1989) is a Thai professional footballer who plays as a centre-back for Thai League 1 club Lamphun Warriors.

He was voted Thai Port's 2010 young player of the year.

Club career
In 2012, he signed for Muangthong United F.C., former 2 times Thai League 1 champions.

International career
Todsapol received his first call up to the Thailand Under 23's and made his debut in a friendly match against Malaysia in January 2011. In September 2014, Todsapol was called up in a friendly match against Kuwait.

International

Honours

Club
Thai Port
 Thai League Cup (1): 2010
 Thai FA Cup (1): 2019

Muangthong United
 Thai Premier League (1): 2012

References

External links
 
 Todsapol Lated profile at Port website
 

1989 births
Living people
Todsapol Lated
Todsapol Lated
Association football central defenders
Todsapol Lated
Todsapol Lated
Todsapol Lated
Todsapol Lated
Todsapol Lated
Todsapol Lated
Todsapol Lated